Phil Lesh and Friends is an American rock band formed and led by Phil Lesh, former bassist of the Grateful Dead.

Phil & Friends is not a traditional group in that several different lineups of musicians have played under the name, including groups featuring members of Phish, the Black Crowes, and the Allman Brothers Band.

Music
The Phil & Friends concept takes the music of the Grateful Dead (and an ever-increasing number of other influences, including Bob Dylan, Traffic, The Beatles, Led Zeppelin, Warren Haynes' band Gov't Mule, the Allman Brothers Band, etc.) and explores and interprets it in new ways. Through the period known as the Quintet years (see below), a Phil & Friends show was often focused on harder, faster rock than that which the Grateful Dead played, thanks in large part to Haynes' and Jimmy Herring's talents at the Southern rock style. Lesh was fond of calling it "Dixieland-style rock". However, all of the incarnations of Phil & Friends have followed a trend of "updating" the Grateful Dead's massive body of work, and all have been extremely adept at the long, exploratory jams that were a trademark of the Dead. Phil & Friends has been acclaimed for giving new life to the Grateful Dead's material, bringing in new styles and innovations, while at the same time remaining loyal to the original music and the original fans. It is this melding of musical influences that has given them extremely wide appeal not only among old Deadheads, but the modern-day fans of other jam bands as well.

Phil & Friends has continued the Grateful Dead's tradition of allowing fans to record concerts, and trade these recordings freely. The Internet has been an invaluable source for these tapers to disseminate this music through various sources, including Archive.org and the BitTorrent file-sharing network. Phil has also embraced the Internet by providing free soundboard recordings of many concerts through his website, even providing high-resolution CD covers for fans to print. For his Summer 2006 tour, Phil partnered with Instant Live, a company that was able to provide soundboard CDs of a concert immediately upon its finishing, as well as make these recordings available for fans to download online, though this service was not free.

History

Original Phil Lesh and Friends
The first use of the Phil Lesh and Friends banner was on September 24, 1994 at the Berkeley Community Theatre. The band was an acoustic version of the Grateful Dead and featured members Phil Lesh, Jerry Garcia, Bob Weir and Vince Welnick. Grateful Dead drummers Bill Kreutzmann and Mickey Hart were not part of the band. After this gig the band name was put to rest until Phil formed a new band in 1998.

1998–2000 permutations
In 1998, Lesh played with a rotating cast of musicians under the Phil Lesh and Friends name, mostly at San Francisco's The Fillmore. Bob Weir, Steve Kimock, Jeff Chimenti, Dave Ellis, Prairie Prince, Scott Amendola, Stan Franks, Gary Lambert, Bobby Strickland and Vince Welnick were among the musicians who participated in the gigs.
 
From April 1999 to September 2000, Lesh toured with a regularly rotating lineup of musicians that included Warren Haynes, Derek Trucks, Jorma Kaukonen, Jimmy Herring, Robben Ford, and members of Phish, Little Feat, The String Cheese Incident and Moe.

The opening concerts on April 15, 16, and 17, 1999 featured Phil along with John Molo on drums, Steve Kimock on guitar, and two members of Phish – Trey Anastasio on guitar and Page McConnell on keys.

After these opening concerts and until October 1999, Phil kept the same "core" of himself and Kimock, and generally Molo as well, while regularly rotating in new musicians on guitar and keys (and sometimes additional instruments).  Over this period, the lineups included:

May 29, 1999: Warren Haynes (guitar and vocals), Merl Saunders (keys), Donna Jean Godchaux (vocals)
June 4–5, 1999: Prairie Prince (drums), Jorma Kaukonen (guitar and vocals), Pete Sears (keys), Zoe Ellis (vocals), Caitlin Cornwell (vocals)
July 2–3, 1999: Bill Kreutzmann (drums), David Nelson (guitar and vocals), Barry Sless (guitar), Mookie Siegel (keys)
August 12–22, 1999: This series of shows generally featured Warren Haynes on guitar and vocals and Kyle Hollingsworth from The String Cheese Incident on keys.  Other members of The String Cheese Incident (Michael Kang (mandolin and violin), Bill Nershi (guitar)) occasionally joined the group, as did Al Schnier of Moe.
October 7–9, 1999: Bobby Strickland (horns), Jeff Mattson  (guitar and vocals), Rob Barraco (keys and vocals)
October 21–27, 1999: This series of shows featured members of Little Feat -- Bill Payne (keys and vocals), Paul Barrere (guitar and vocals)

Steve Kimock left the tour on October 29, 1999, and Derek Trucks joined a few days later.
 October 29–30, 1999: Bill Payne (keys and vocals), Paul Barrere (guitar and vocals)
 October 31, 1999: Derek Trucks (guitar), Bill Payne (keys and vocals), Paul Barrere (guitar and vocals)

From November 1999 onwards, the "core" of the group was Phil, John Molo, and Rob Barraco on keys (except where noted)

November 2–14, 1999: Derek Trucks (guitar), Warren Haynes (guitar and vocals);
November 15, 1999: Derek Trucks (guitar), Warren Haynes (guitar and vocals), Jorma Kaukonen (guitar and vocals);
November 17–18, 1999: Warren Haynes (guitar and vocals), Jorma Kaukonen (guitar and vocals);
March 10, 2000: Robben Ford (guitar and vocals), Bill Payne (keys and vocals), Paul Barrere (guitar and vocals)
April 6-May 27, 2000: Jeff Pevar (guitar and vocals), Jimmy Herring (guitar)

For the summer 2000 tour, the lineup primarily consistent of Robben Ford and members of Little Feat

June 12–July 15, 2000: Robben Ford (guitar and vocals), Paul Barrere (guitar and vocals), Bill Payne (keys and vocals)
July 16–18, 2000: Jimmy Herring (guitar), Paul Barrere (guitar and vocals), Bill Payne (keys and vocals)
July 19–30, 2000: Robben Ford (guitar and vocals), Paul Barrere (guitar and vocals), Bill Payne (keys and vocals)

The Phil Lesh Quintet 

The most permanent of the Phil Lesh and Friends lineups, known as the Phil Lesh Quintet (PLQ or just "the Q" for short) played on a mostly-regular basis from September 2000 through December 2003. The members of this incarnation were Lesh, Warren Haynes (guitar & vocals; also of Gov't Mule and Allman Brothers Band), Jimmy Herring (guitar; the Allman Brothers Band, Aquarium Rescue Unit, and most recently Widespread Panic), Rob Barraco (keyboards; the Dead, the Zen Tricksters, Dark Star Orchestra) and John Molo (drums; Bruce Hornsby and the Range, the Other Ones, Modereko, Keller Williams, David Nelson Band, Jemimah Puddleduck, and John Fogerty).

This lineup released the only Phil Lesh and Friends studio album, There and Back Again, on Columbia Records in 2002. It included several new songs from Lesh and Robert Hunter, longtime Grateful Dead lyricist, as well as one recent favorite from Jerry Garcia and Hunter, and several original contributions from Haynes, Barraco/Mattson and Herring.

During the summer tour of 2001, the band performed a series of instrumental numbers composed by Lesh. The songs were inspired by the solar system. While they were never officially released on an album, they have come to be known as the Planet Jams. A bootleg compilation of these songs has been circulating since then.

Post Quintet Era
Ryan Adams started performing with the band in June 2005 after meeting Lesh at the Jammys, followed by Chris Robinson in November/December 2005.

2006
During 2006, Phil Lesh and Friends consisted of a core of musicians including Lesh, Larry Campbell (guitar, violin, slide guitar, mandolin, and vocals), Joan Osborne (vocals), Rob Barraco (keyboards and vocals), and John Molo (drums).  On the first half of the summer tour, they were joined by John Scofield (guitar), and on the second half, by Barry Sless (pedal steel) and, during the third quarter of the tour and generally for the second set, by Trey Anastasio.  Saxophonist Greg Osby joined the group for various concerts, particularly toward the end of the tour, and guest artists including Page McConnell and Dickey Betts sat in for individual sets.

Concerts with Scofield had a jazzy, astringent quality.  Anastasio contributed a strong rock lead guitar to the sets he played in, while Sless brought a softer, more lyrical quality.  The relative lack of comment about these lineups compared to the earlier "Quintet" and later 2007-8 configuration suggests that they were not as popular with Lesh's core fan base, but they gave unique and varied interpretations to some of the Grateful Dead's classics along with numerous other songs.  Furthermore, the fact that the entire tour was distributed online and later via Instant Live CDs, and a live DVD was made of an early concert at the Warfield (with Scofield and Osby), meant that the various configurations of the year's lineup left a larger body of recorded work than many groups that worked together for years.

2007–2008

A new formation of Phil & Friends, including Lesh, Larry Campbell (guitar, mandolin, fiddle), Teresa Williams (vocals), Jackie Greene (vocals and guitar), Steve Molitz (keyboards), and John Molo (drums), debuted in September 2007 in Santa Barbara, California.

On February 4, 2008, Phil and Friends joined Grateful Dead guitarist Bob Weir and drummer Mickey Hart, along with Barry Sless and RatDog guitarist Mark Karan, for a concert called "Deadheads for Obama", in support of Barack Obama's presidential campaign. The show was the first time that Weir, Hart, and Lesh had played together since 2004. Even more recently, the band performed the final shows at the Warfield Theatre in San Francisco. Bob Weir sat in for a run of five nights that included sets of the Grateful Dead's first few albums.

In the fall of 2008, Phil Lesh and Friends toured the Eastern United States, including a run of 14 shows in 19 days, known as "Philathon", at the Nokia Theatre Times Square in New York City. The final Phil Lesh and Friends performance until 2012 was on 12/31/08. Meanwhile, Phil had been touring with The Dead and Furthur.

2012 
On Phil Lesh's website, 3 dates at the 1stBank Center in Broomfield, Colorado, were scheduled for the February 16, 17, and 18. A twelve-date appearance at Lesh's new club, Terrapin Crossroads, is set to commence on March 17, 2012, which many old members of the band returning to appear alongside Lesh, as well as a few new members.

On April 26 through April 29 the original Quintet returned, performing four sold-out shows at Terrapin Crossroads.

The band also appeared at the 2012 Gathering of the Vibes and All Good Music Festival, featuring Phil Lesh, Jackie Greene, Grahame Lesh, Brian Lesh, Joe Russo, Larry Campbell, and Teresa Williams

2014
In 2014, Phil Lesh signed an exclusive deal with concert promoter Peter Shapiro to perform 44 concerts across Shapiro's venues. Thirty of those performances would take place at the Capitol Theatre in Port Chester, New York, with the others at the Brooklyn Bowls in New York, London and Las Vegas, as well as the Lockn' Festival in Arrington, Virginia.

Phil Lesh and Friends featuring Warren Haynes, Jackie Greene, John Medeski and Joe Russo performed two shows on April 14 and 15 at Brooklyn Academy of Music.

Phil and Friends then played two shows at Central Park's Rumsey Playfield on May 28 and 31. The incarnation of this band included  Warren Haynes, John Scofield, John Medeski and Joe Russo.

2015–2016
Starting in January 2015, Phil Lesh and Friends celebrated the Grateful Dead's 50th Anniversary by performing tribute concerts, recreating select concerts from the Grateful Dead's 30-year career,  at his restaurant Terrapin Crossroads, along with select Grateful Dead Recreational Tribute shows at The Capitol Theatre, in Port Chester, New York. These celebrations of the Grateful Dead's 50th Anniversary continued into 2016.

In 2015, Phil Lesh And Friends had to cancel two shows at Terrapin Crossroads on October 24–25, due to the bladder cancer diagnosis of Phil Lesh.

At the 2015 Lockn' Festival, Carlos Santana made his debut as one of Phil's "Friends", sitting in for the whole set. The next night at Lock'n, The Chris Robinson Brotherhood also sat in with Phil Lesh & Friends.

In celebration of Phil's 76th birthday in 2015, Phil resurrected the classic "Q" lineup for a 2-night run at The Capitol Theatre, in Port Chester.

In January 2016, it was announced that Phil Lesh and Friends will perform a New Year's Eve run in Hawaii, from December 29–31.

Discography
 Love Will See You Through (1999)
 There and Back Again (2002)
 Live at the Warfield (2006)

Members
The following musicians have accompanied bassist and vocalist Phil Lesh with various lineups of Phil Lesh & Friends from 1999 to present day (with one performance in 1994).Note: This list is incomplete.

Ryan Adams – guitar, vocals
Stu Allen - guitar, vocals
Trey Anastasio – guitar, vocals
Rob Barraco – keyboards, vocals
Rick Mitarotonda – guitar, vocals
Paul Barrere – guitar, vocals
Michael Mark Bello – tenor saxophone, kazoo, vocals, percussion, drums, horn arrangements 
Duane Betts - guitar, vocals
Eric Bloom – trumpet
Nicki Bluhm – vocals
Tim Bluhm – guitar, vocals
Travis Book – double bass
Holly Bowling – keyboards
Larry Campbell – guitar, vocals
Neal Casal – guitar, vocals
Jeff Chimenti – keyboards, vocals
Cailan Cornwell – vocals
Jason Crosby – keyboards
Mikaela Davis - harp, vocals
Karl Denson – saxophone, flute, percussion
Luther Dickinson – guitar, vocals
JD Simo – guitar, vocals
Rob Eaton – guitar, vocals
Dave Ellis – saxophone
Zoe Ellis – vocals
Alan Evans – drums
Neal Evans – keyboards
Andy Falco – guitar
Jon Fishman – drums
Robben Ford – guitar
Donna Jean Godchaux – vocals
Jerry Garcia – guitar, vocals
Jeremy Garrett – fiddle
Jon Graboff – guitar
Griffin Goldsmith – drums, vocals
Taylor Goldsmith – guitar, vocals
Mike Gordon – bass, vocals
Jackie Greene – guitar, vocals
Andy Hall – dobro
Warren Haynes – guitar, vocals
Amy Helm – vocals
Jimmy Herring – guitar
Kyle Hollingsworth – keyboards
Ross James – guitar, vocals
Gloria Jones – vocals
Stanley Jordan – guitar, vocals
John Kadlecik – guitar, vocals
Mark Karan – guitar, vocals
Michael Kang – guitar, vocals
Jorma Kaukonen – guitar, vocals
Steve Kimock – guitar
Marcus King – guitar, vocals 
Alex Koford – percussion, vocals
Bill Kreutzmann – drums
Jaclyn LaBranch – vocals
Scott Law – guitar, vocals
Dan Lebowitz - guitar, pedal steel, vocals
Tony Leone – drums
Brian Lesh – guitars, vocals
Grahame Lesh – guitars, vocals
Ezra Lipp – drums, vocals
Scott Guberman – keyboards, vocals
Mark Levy – drums
Adam MacDougall – keyboards
Branford Marsalis – saxophone
Jeff Mattson – guitar, vocals
John Mayer – guitar, vocals
Page McConnell – keyboards, vocals
John Medeski – keyboards
Trevor Menear – guitar, vocals, harmonica
Scott Metzger – guitar, vocals
Steve Molitz – keyboards
John Molo – drums
David Nelson – guitar, vocals
Bill Nershi – guitar, vocals
Tom Osander – drums, vocals
Anders Osborne – guitar, vocals
Joan Osborne – vocals
Greg Osby – saxophone
Chris Pandolfi – banjo
Lee Pardini – keyboards
Bill Payne – keyboards, vocals
Jeff Pevar – guitar
Prairie Prince – drums
Chris Robinson – guitar, vocals
Joe Russo – drums
Merl Saunders – keyboards
Jaz Sawyer – drums
Al Schnier – guitar, vocals
John Scofield – guitar
Melvin Seals – keyboards
Pete Sears – keyboards
Mookie Siegel – keyboards
Jeff Sipe – drums
Barry Sless – guitar
Bobby Strickland – horns
Benmont Tench – keyboards
Derek Trucks – guitar
Bob Weir – guitar, vocals
Vince Welnick – keyboards, vocals
Teresa Williams – vocals
Ryan Zoidis – saxophone

References

External links
 PhilLesh.net — Phil Lesh's official website
 PhilZone.com — fan website

Rock music groups from California
Grateful Dead
Jam bands
Relix Records artists
Columbia Records artists